Green Movement may refer to:
 Green politics, a political ideology
 Green Movement in Bulgaria
 Green Movement in India
 Ukrainian Green movement
 Green Movement of Sri Lanka
 The Green Party (Israel), a social-environmental political party formerly known as the Green Movement
 Iranian Green Movement, a series after the 2009 Iranian presidential election